Edward Spencer Abraham (born June 12, 1952) is an American attorney, author, and politician who served as the tenth United States Secretary of Energy from 2001 to 2005, under President George W. Bush. A member of the Republican Party, Abraham previously served as a United States Senator from Michigan from 1995 to 2001. Abraham is one of the founders of the Federalist Society, and a co-founder of the Harvard Journal of Law and Public Policy. As of 2023, he remains the last Republican to serve as a U.S. senator from Michigan.

Education and family
Abraham was born in East Lansing, Michigan, the son of Juliette Elizabeth (Sear), a member of the Michigan Republican State Central Committee, and Eddie Joseph Abraham. He is a graduate of East Lansing High School.  Of Lebanese descent, Abraham is married to Jane Abraham, chair of the Susan B. Anthony List. They have three children. He holds a Juris Doctor (J.D.) degree from Harvard University, and is a 1974 Honors College graduate of Michigan State University. In 1978, while at Harvard Law School, Abraham helped found the Harvard Journal of Law and Public Policy. It became one of the official journals of the Federalist Society, which was founded in 1982.

Political career 
Before his election to the Senate, Abraham was a law professor at Thomas M. Cooley Law School.

Republican Party service 
He was elected chairman of the Michigan Republican Party from 1983 to 1990. He was deputy chief of staff for Vice President Dan Quayle from 1990 to 1991. He later served as co-chairman of the National Republican Congressional Committee (NRCC) from 1991 to 1993 and ran for chairman of the Republican National Committee in 1993, coming second to Haley Barbour.

United States Senate 
Abraham was elected to represent Michigan in the United States Senate in 1994, and he served until 2001 after being defeated for reelection in 2000 by Debbie Stabenow. He was the only Middle Eastern American in the chamber. According to the New York Times, state Republicans attributed his loss to "scathing advertisements by a wide range of special interest groups, including advertisements that criticized Mr. Abraham's support for a relaxation of some immigration restrictions". During the campaign, the Federation for American Immigration Reform, an anti-immigration advocacy group with ties to white nationalism, ran ads asking: "Why is Senator Spencer Abraham trying to make it easier for terrorists like Osama bin Laden to export their war of terror to any city street in America?" The media denounced these commercials as "vengeful". In 1996, when President Bill Clinton endorsed Representative Barbara Jordan's proposed cuts to legal immigration, Abraham played a leading role in blocking the cuts. Another factor in his defeat was his vote to convict Clinton in his 1999 impeachment trial. The next year he received the "Defender of the Melting Pot" award from the National Council of La Raza for his efforts on immigration.

Committee service and legislation
Abraham served on the Budget, Commerce, Science and Transportation, Judiciary, and Small Business Committees. He also chaired two subcommittees: Manufacturing and Competitiveness, and Immigration. Abraham authored the H1B Visa in Global and National Commerce Act, establishing a federal framework for online contracts and signatures; the Government Paperwork Elimination Act, and the Anti-Cybersquatting Consumer Protection Act, which protects Internet domain names for businesses and persons against copyright and trademark infringements. In 1999, Abraham co-sponsored S.896, a bill to abolish the U.S. Department of Energy, which would have transferred control of the Strategic Petroleum Reserve in large part to the Defense Department.

U.S. Energy Secretary

In 2001 George W. Bush appointed Abraham Secretary of Energy. On November 15, 2004, Abraham announced that he would resign from this position, effective with the swearing-in of his successor, Samuel W. Bodman, on February 1, 2005.

In 2004, Lebanese Ambassador Farid Abboud awarded Abraham the National Order of the Cedar.

Hoover Institution 
From 2005 to 2007, Abraham was a Distinguished Visiting Fellow at the Hoover Institution, a think tank based at Stanford University. After leaving office, he opened The Abraham Group, a Washington DC-based international strategic consulting firm, of which he is chairman and CEO.

Fred Thompson presidential campaign
On July 24, 2007, Abraham was announced as an "ambassador to official Washington" for Fred Thompson's 2008 presidential campaign.

Later career
In 2006 Abraham was appointed Non-Executive Chairman of the Board of AREVA Inc., the American arm of the French nuclear company Areva, which is planning to build EPR nuclear power plants in the United States and is building the mixed oxide fuel (MOX) manufacturing plant at the Savannah River Site to convert legacy weapons-grade plutonium into power station fuel.

With William Tucker, Abraham wrote Lights Out!: Ten Myths About (and Real Solutions to) America's Energy Crisis (2010).

In 2016, Abraham was elected to the board of trustees of the California Institute of Technology.

Electoral history

See also
List of Arab and Middle-Eastern Americans in the United States Congress

References

External links 
 Secretary of Energy Spencer Abraham
 Presidential Profile: George W. Bush's Cabinet

 

|-

|-

|-

|-

1952 births
21st-century American politicians
American politicians of Lebanese descent
Federalist Society members
George W. Bush administration cabinet members
Harvard Law School alumni
Living people
Michigan Republicans
Michigan Republican Party chairs
Michigan State University alumni
Middle Eastern Christians
People from East Lansing, Michigan
Recipients of the National Order of the Cedar
Republican Party United States senators from Michigan
United States Secretaries of Energy
Eastern Orthodox Christians from the United States
Members of Congress who became lobbyists